In Vedic astrology a constant reference is made to the Navamsa occupied by planets and the Lagna-point. Both, the Rasi-chart and the Navamsa-chart are deemed equally important and therefore, consulted together. Whereas the Rasi-chart provides overall information regarding the location of planets and sensitive-points such as the Lagna, the latter provides vital information regarding their active quality and strength. A planet may be well-placed in the natal-chart Rasi-wise but its full effects may not materialise if its situation in the navamsa-chart is not supportive.

Definition

In Vedic astrology, Navamsa means one-ninth part of a Zodiac Sign. Navamsa literally means the "Ninth Division". Thus, each navamsa measures 3 degrees and 20 minutes in longitude or one-quarter of a Nakshatra (Constellation), and the Zodiac of Signs comprises 108 navamsas. There are 3 important ways of reckoning a Navamsa Chart: 
1. Parasara Navamsa 
2. Krishna Mishra Navamsa
3. Somanatha Navamsa

Parasara Navamsa Method:
1. Aries, Leo & Sagittarius - Starts from Aries up to Sagittarius in direct motion.
2. Taurus, Virgo & Capricorn - Starts from Capricorn to Virgo in direct motion.
3. Gemini, Libra & Aquarius - Starts from Libra to Gemini in direct motion.
4. Cancer, Scorpio & Pisces - Starts from Cancer to Pisces in direct motion.

Krishna Mishra Navamsa Method:
1. Aries, Leo & Sagittarius - Starts from Aries up to Sagittarius in direct motion.
2. Taurus, Virgo & Capricorn - Starts from Capricorn to Taurus in backward motion.
3. Gemini, Libra & Aquarius - Starts from Libra to Gemini in direct motion.
4. Cancer, Scorpio & Pisces - Starts from Cancer to Scorpio in backward motion.

Somanatha Navamsa Method: 
1. Aries, Leo & Sagittarius - Starts from Aries up to Sagittarius in direct motion.
2. Taurus, Virgo & Capricorn - Starts from Virgo to Capricorn in backward motion.
3. Gemini, Libra & Aquarius - Starts from Libra to Gemini in direct motion.
4. Cancer, Scorpio & Pisces - Starts from Pisces to Cancer in backward motion.

The lords of 1st, 4th and 7th navamsa of a sign represent the Deva ("Divine beings" and constructive forces); persons born with any of these navamsas rising in the Lagna are generous, religious, wealthy, powerful and influential. Persons born in the 2nd, 5th or the 8th navamsa whose lords represent the Naras ("Human beings" and their efforts) are generally kind, good natured, engaged in the pursuits of human welfare and reputed; and in the 3rd, the 6th or the 9th navamsa whose lords represent the Rakshasas ("Demonic beings" and evil forces) are selfish, cruel, violent, destructive and possess many negative qualities. Moreover, the Lagna-rasi and the Lagna-lord should not form or occupy the 6th, the 8th or the 12th bhava in the Navamsa Chart nor the lords of the 6th, the 8th or the 12th of the Rasi Chart associate with the Navamsa Lagna or its lord.

In the Jaimini System of prognostication the use of eight karakas determined according to the respective minutes & seconds of the eight planets is recommended and their navamsa-occupation noted. Any planet can acquire any karakatwa but the prime indicator is the Atmakaraka along with the various lagnas and padas.

Implication

A Navamsa is equal to one-ninth part of a sign or one nakshatra-pada (one-fourth part of a constellation) and is one of the Shodasvargas i.e. one of the sixteen sub-divisions of a sign that give more and more precise good or bad position of a planet or lagna-point in the natal-chart vis-à-vis other signs and sign-lords. Birth in Vargottama Lagna is considered very fortunate and planets in Vargottama are very strong and confer benefic results if they do not occupy inimical signs. The occupation of own navamsa by a planet is superior to the occupation of its exaltation-navamsa. The planet which is in its exaltation sign in the Rasi-chart but situated in its neecha-navamsa (debilitated in Navamsa-chart) produces its bad results very soon, however, a planet situated in its debilitation sign in the Rasi-chart but in its uccha-navamsa (exalted in Navamsa-chart) invariably confers auspicious results. If at the time of birth planets are placed in inimical signs even if they be in Vargottama they render all Raja yogas useless, the same is true if many planets are in debilitation. The Rajayogakarakas cease to be Rajayogakarakas if they happen to occupy their neecha-navamsas. Saturn occupying its own or exaltation sign does not afflict natural benefics or their yoga-formations provided it does not simultaneously occupy its neecha-navamsa but all planets occupying navamsas ruled by Jupiter usually act as benefics and if situated in a kendra, in the 9th or in the 2nd house from the lagna make one very learned, famous and even establish a new school of thought or system. Rahu and Ketu (mythology) do not rule any navamsa-division but a navamsa of Mars is to be found in all signs.

Results of planetary periods (dashas) and sub-periods (antra-dashas) vary in accordance with the particular location of those bhava-lords in the Navamsa-chart. A planet otherwise strongly placed in the Rasi-chart with reference to a specific bhava or its lord does not produce in its own dasha/antra-dasha the anticipated good results relating to that bhava in full if it happens to be situated in the navamsa-chart in the 6th, the 8th or the 12th from the sign occupied by that particular bhava-lord e.g. the lord of the Lagna situated in the 3rd house in conjunction with the lord of the 3rd gives prosperous, happy and helpful brothers but if in the navamsa-chart the lord of the lagna is in the 6th, the 8th or the 12th from the lord of the 3rd then there may be enmity with brothers or sorrow to them. If the lord of the 2nd house is in conjunction with the lord of the 10th situated in the 10th house and the lord of the lagna is involved in Rajayoga one secures a high political or administrative position during the dasha/antra-dasha of the lord of the 2nd house but in case in the navamsa-chart the lord of the 2nd is in the 6th, the 8th or the 12th from the lord of the 10th then contrary results will be experienced.

In Prasna Marga the author has in addition to the Navamsa also referred to the Nava Navamsa and the Navamsa Dwadasamsa positions, the former position is obtained by multiplying the actual longitude (signs included) of a planet by 81, and the latter by multiplying the actual longitude (signs excluded) of a planet by 12. In Horary astrology, the navamsa-lagna has a direct bearing on the level of success reached; it should be ruled by a benefic planet and not be in a Shunya Rasi at the time of performing any beneficial activity, be of planets whose varas are favourable for the event. Negative effects diminish if benefic are strong in the lagna, in a kendra or in a trine, the situation of the Moon in 11th house removes all defects. The Navamsa Chart is also called the "Fortune Chart", for it is the hidden force and on its strength or weakness depends how one’s destiny unfolds; it gives the measure of destiny. This chart, which complements the Rasi Chart, helps judge the strengths and weaknesses of planets and their respective dispositors as at the time of one’s birth, at the time of query and for purpose of fixing auspicious  muhurtas.

Role in Yoga formation

All yoga formations follow inviolable basic rules and principles and therefore, the yogas described by the various texts are very certain in their construction and impact. All sub-divisions of a sign, including the navamsa situation of planets, have prescribed roles and results and contribute to their  determination. For example, a Raja yoga description reads as follows:
If at the time of birth the Moon situated in a trikona-bhava (trine) is in the 8th navamsa of Aquarius, Mars occupies the 7th navamsa of Aries and Mercury is in the 21st vimsamsa of Gemini, a king is born.
This yoga is possible for Gemini lagna and Libra lagna. Then, the Moon occupying its exalted navamsa will be in a trikona-bhava from a strong Mercury. Mars in its own sign in the house of gains (11th house) or in the 7th, casting its aspect on the lagna while occupying an unfriendly but a benefic navamsa can make one an unforgiving undisputed undefeated despot. In the case of Gemini lagna the person will be a very wealthy ruler, and in the case of Libra lagna the person will be an all-conquering emperor.
And, for example,
Jataka Tattva states that first find out in which drekkena (decanate) the lords of the 2nd and the 11th are placed, then find out the lords of the navamsas that are occupied by the lords of those drekkenas, if the lords of these navamsas attain Vaishesika-amsa and occupy the kendras or the trikonas from the lagna then the person will be blessed with a very sound financial status.
Vaishesika-amsa is attained when a planet not in its debilitation sign or combust or defeated in grahyuddha avoiding a trika-bhava (6th, 8th or 12th) happens to occupy all ten own, friendly or exalted vargas (sub-divisions) of a sign.

As per Jaimini the financial status of a person is indicated by the Lagnarudha and its lord. Arudha lagna associated with benefics gives wealth, if the 2nd house from this lagna is occupied by Venus, Moon and Jupiter or if the Arudha rasi of the 7th house happens to be a kendra or trikona or the 3rd or 11th from Lagnarudha the person will be very wealthy. Poverty is indicated if the Arudha rasi of the 7th falls on the 6th, the 8th or the 12th from Lagnarudha. There will be destruction of wealth through association with women of ill-repute if the 9th from Karakamsa is joined by Rahu. Karakamsa is the navamsa occupied by the Atmakaraka, the planet most advanced in any one sign in one's natal chart. Planet which is in 12th House of Karakamsa Lagna is Indicates Ishta Devata. Worshipping the deity Signified by that Planet will Help in Spiritual Progress.

References

External links
"Concepts to read Navamsa"
Truly Divine website

Technical factors of Hindu astrology